Lithacodes gracea, the graceful slug moth, is a species of slug caterpillar moth in the family Limacodidae.

The MONA or Hodges number for Lithacodes gracea is 4664.

References

Further reading

External links

 

Limacodidae
Moths described in 1921
Taxa named by Harrison Gray Dyar Jr.